KDM or Kdm may refer to:
 Korean domestic market, Korea's economic market system
 KDE Display Manager, a graphical login interface for Unix-like operating systems
 Knowledge Discovery Metamodel, specification for architecture-driven modernization
 Kongelige Danske Marine (His/Her Danish Majesty's Ship), ship prefix of the Royal Danish Navy
 Kingdom Death: Monster, a cooperative board game created by Adam Poots
 Martin KDM Plover, target drone conversion of the PTV-N-2 Gorgon IV missile
 KDM Shipping, a holding company based from Cyprus
 Social Democratic Harmony Party, or Parti Kesejahteraan Demokratik Masyarakat, a Sabah-based local political party of Malaysia.

See also